Jerzy Michalski (9 April 1924 in Warsaw – 26 February 2007 in Warsaw) was a Polish historian, specializing in the 18th and 19th centuries. He was a professor of the Institutenof History at the Polish Academy of Sciences. Author of numerous works.

1924 births
2007 deaths
20th-century Polish historians
Polish male non-fiction writers
Historians of Poland
Academic staff of the University of Warsaw